Liverpool Scotland Exchange was a borough constituency within the city and metropolitan borough of Liverpool, in the English county of Merseyside. It elected one Member of Parliament (MP) by the first past the post system of election.

Boundaries
The County Borough of Liverpool wards of Abercromby, Central, Everton, Netherfield, St James, Sandhills, and Vauxhall.

The constituency was formed in 1974 from Liverpool Exchange and Liverpool Scotland. It was partially replaced by the new Liverpool Riverside constituency for the 1983 election.

Members of Parliament

Elections

References

Parliamentary constituencies in North West England (historic)
Scotland Exchange
Constituencies of the Parliament of the United Kingdom established in 1974
Constituencies of the Parliament of the United Kingdom disestablished in 1983